Eduard Strauch (17 August 1906 – 15 September 1955) was a German Nazi SS functionary, commander of Einsatzkommando 2, commander of two Nazi organizations, the Security Police (German: Sicherheitspolizei), or Sipo, and the Security Service (German: Sicherheitsdienst, or SD), first in Belarus – then called White Russia or White Ruthenia – and later in Belgium. In October 1944, he was transferred to the militarised branch of the SS, the Waffen-SS.

Strauch was convicted for crimes against humanity in the Einsatzgruppen Trial and sentenced to death. Extradited to Belgium, he was again convicted and sentenced to death. However, Strauch was not executed since he was supposedly mentally ill. He died in a Belgian hospital in 1955.

Life 
Born in Essen, Strauch first studied theology at the universities of Erlangen (now Erlangen-Nuremberg) and Münster, but changed his course of studies and graduated with a degree in jurisprudence. On 1 August 1931, he joined the Nazi Party (membership no. 623.392) and SA. On 1 December 1931, he became a member of the Nazi SS organization (membership no. 19.312). As of December 1934 he began working for the SD.

Crimes against humanity 
At the beginning of the German invasion of the Soviet Union in June,1941, Strauch assumed command of a unit of the Einsatzgruppen. Strauch led Einsatzkommando 2, part of Einsatzgruppe A, which from 4 November 1941 was under the command of Franz Walter Stahlecker. On 30 November 1941, he participated, with 20 men under his command, in the murder of 10,600 Jews of Riga in the Rumbula forest near the city. As a reward for this "service" he was promoted to commander in Sipo and the SD and transferred to Belarus.

In July 1943, the Nazi general commissioner for White Russia reported on having had a conference with the "extremely capable [...] chief of the SD, SS-Obersturmbannführer Dr. jur. Strauch", who had caused "the liquidation of 55,000 Jews in just the past 10 weeks alone." Strauch had difficulties within the SS. SS-Obergruppenführer Erich von dem Bach-Zelewski, himself a perpetrator of the genocide, described Strauch as "the worst human I ever met in my life". Strauch's promotion to Standartenführer was denied. On 31 May 1944, he was appointed Sipo and SD commander in Belgium. In October 1944 Strauch was transferred to the SS military branch the Waffen-SS.

Trial and conviction 
Despite an effort to sham mental illness, Strauch was convicted by the Nuremberg Military Tribunal in the Einsatzgruppen Trial for having a key role in the Rumbula and a number of other mass murders in Eastern Europe. On 9 April 1948, Presiding judge Michael Musmanno pronounced the tribunal's sentence on Strauch:
 Unlike his co-defendants Otto Ohlendorf and Paul Blobel, Strauch did not hang. Instead, he was handed over to authorities in Belgium, where he had committed other crimes, for trial. He was once more convicted and sentenced to death, but this sentence likewise was never carried out since the Belgians were convinced that he was indeed mentally ill. Strauch died in custody on 15 September 1955 in a hospital in Uccle, Belgium.

Notes

References 
 Trials of War Criminals before the Nuernberg Military Tribunals under Control Council Law No. 10, Nuernberg, October 1946 - April 1949, Volume IV, ("Green Series) (the "Einsatzgruppen case") also available at Mazel library (well indexed HTML version)

External links 
  Biography and photograph of Strauch at Olokaustos.org

1906 births
1955 deaths
Military personnel from Essen
People from the Rhine Province
Nazi Party politicians
SS and Police Leaders
SS-Obersturmbannführer
Einsatzgruppen personnel
Sturmabteilung personnel
Young German Order members
Holocaust perpetrators in Belgium
Holocaust perpetrators in Latvia
Holocaust perpetrators in Belarus
German people convicted of crimes against humanity
People convicted by the United States Nuremberg Military Tribunals
German prisoners sentenced to death
Prisoners sentenced to death by the United States military
Prisoners sentenced to death by Belgium
Nazis who died in prison custody
Waffen-SS personnel
Lawyers in the Nazi Party
Prisoners who died in Belgian detention